Richard Boyle (born 24 September 1869) was a Scottish professional footballer.

Career
Boyle played club football in Scotland and England for Dumbarton, Everton, New Brighton Tower and Dundee.

Honours
Dumbarton
 Scottish League: Champions 1890-1891;1891-1892
 Scottish Cup: Runners Up 1890-1891
 Dumbartonshire Cup: Winners 1889–90;1890–91;1891-1892
 League Charity Cup: Winners 1890–91
 1 cap for the Scottish League in 1892
 1 international trial for Scotland in 1892
 2 representative caps for Dumbartonshire during the 1889-90 season.

References

External links
London Hearts Profile

1869 births
Scottish footballers
Dumbarton F.C. players
Everton F.C. players
Dundee F.C. players
Scottish Football League players
English Football League players
Year of death missing
Scottish Football League representative players
Association football central defenders
New Brighton Tower F.C. players
FA Cup Final players